Bazaar Stars Charity Night is an annual fundraising gala hosted by Harper’s Bazaar China in China for Chinese celebrities who support charities. The event was founded at 2003 due to the outbreak of SARS upon Na Ying's suggestion and the fundraising event was continued every year ever since. Since 2014, the charity night has been a collaboration between Harper's Bazaar China and Zhejiang Television where the latter will broadcast the charity night on national television. In recent years, the event is divided into the auction segment and the donation segment with intervals of performances.

Origin

Suggestion 
During the outbreak of SARS, the crew of Harper's Bazaar China felt a strong social responsibility to contribute for the betterment of the society. Singer Na Ying suggested auctioning clothes and items owned by fellow celebrities and donate the money to the poor. First few years of operation for this fund raising event was not a media highlight as not many sponsors and brands gave their support. The induction of more celebrities made the fundraising event a national event and a commercial success. The event is attended by the Chinese entertainment industry with guest ranging from singers, actors, actresses to entertainment moguls.

Fund raising

References 

Annual events in China
Charity events
Charity in China
Harper's Bazaar
Zhejiang Television original programming